The 387th Tactical Fighter Squadron is an inactive United States Air Force unit. Its last assignment was with the 312th Tactical Fighter Wing at Cannon Air Force Base, New Mexico, where it was inactivated on 18 February 1959.

History

World War II
Established in early 1942 as a light bomber squadron, equipped with Douglas A-24 Banshees, although equipped with export model Vultee A-31 Vengeance dive bombers for training.  Trained under Third Air Force in the southeast United States, also used for antisubmarine patrols over the Atlantic southeast coast and then Gulf of Mexico.

Deployed to Southern California in early 1943 to the Desert Warfare Center, trained in light bombing while supporting Army maneuvers in the Mojave Desert until October.

Re-equipped with North American A-36 Apache dive bombers and deployed to New Guinea as part of Fifth Air Force.  In the Southwest Pacific the squadron attacked Japanese strong points and tactical positions and targets of opportunity in support of General Douglas MacArthur's campaign along the north coast of New Guinea; then advancing into the Netherlands East Indies and Philippines as part of the island hopping campaign.  Re-equipped with Curtiss P-40 Warhawks; then later Douglas A-20 Havocs.   Engaged in heavy fighting on Leyte; Mindoro and Luzon in the Philippines during 1944–1945.

The squadron moved to Okinawa in mid-August and after the atomic bomb missions had been flown; remained on Okinawa until December until returning to the United States with most personnel demobilizing. It was inactivated as a paper unit on 6 January 1946.

Reserve operations
The squadron was reactivated as a B-29 Superfortress unit in the reserves in 1947, but lack of funding and personnel led to rapid inactivation.

Cold War fighter operations
Transferred to Tactical Air Command in the mid-1950s and activated first with North American F-86 Sabres, then North American F-100 Super Sabres in 1958.   Inactivated in 1959 when its parent 312th Tactical Fighter Wing was inactivated and its personnel and equipment transferred to the 27th Tactical Fighter Wing.   Squadron personnel and equipment of the squadron were transferred to the 523d Tactical Fighter Squadron.

Lineage
 Constituted as the 387th Bombardment Squadron (Light) on 28 January 1942
 Activated on 15 March 1942
 Redesignated 387th Bombardment Squadron (Dive) on 27 July 1942
 Redesignated 387th Bombardment Squadron, Light on 6 December 1943
 Redesignated 387th Bombardment Squadron, Heavy on 19 July 1945
 Inactivated on 18 December 1945
 Redesignated 387th Bombardment Squadron, Very Heavy on 14 July 1947
 Activated in the reserve on 30 July 1947
 Inactivated on 27 June 1949
 Redesignated 387th Fighter-Bomber Squadron on 29 July 1954
 Activated on 1 October 1954
 Redesignated 387th Tactical Fighter Squadron on 1 July 1958
 Inactivated on 18 February 1959

Assignments
 312th Bombardment Group, 15 March 1942 – 18 December 1945
 Tenth Air Force, 30 July 1947
 312th Bombardment Group, 13 August 1947 – 27 June 1949
 312th Fighter-Bomber Group, October 1954
 312th Fighter-Bomber Wing (later 312th Tactical Fighter Wing), 8 October 1957 – 18 February 1959

Stations

 Bowman Field, Kentucky, 15 March 1942
 Will Rogers Field, Oklahoma, 12 June 1942
 Hunter Field, Georgia, 18 August 1942
 DeRidder Army Air Base, Louisiana, 18 February 1943
 Rice Army Air Field, California, 13 April 1943
 Salinas Army Air Base, California, 13 August – 24 October 1943
 Jackson Airfield (7 Mile Drome), Port Moresby, New Guinea, c. 1 December 1943
 Gusap Airfield, New Guinea, c. 25 December 1943
 Nadzab Airfield Complex, New Guinea, c. 10 June 1944
 Hollandia Airfield Complex, Netherlands East Indies, c. 10 July 1944

 Tanauan Airfield, Leyte, Philippines, 19 November 1944
 McGuire Field, Mindoro, Philippines, c. 25 January 1945
 Mangaldan Airfield, Luzon, Philippines, 10 February 1945
 Floridablanca Airfield, Luzon, Philippines, 16 April 1945
 Yontan Airfield, Okinawa, 12 August – 13 December 1945
 Vancouver, Washington, 3–6 January 1946
 Ellington Field, Texas, 30 July 1947 – 27 June 1949
 Clovis Air Force Base (Later Cannon Air Force Base), New Mexico, 1 October 1954 – 18 February 1959

Aircraft

 Vultee A-31 Vengeance, 1942–1943
 Douglas A-24 Banshee, 1942–1943
 North American A-36 Apache, 1943
 Curtiss P-40 Warhawk, 1943–1944
 Douglas A-20 Havoc, 1944–1945
 North American F-86 Sabre, 1955–1956
 North American F-100 Super Sabre, 1956–1959

References

Notes
 Explanatory notes

 Citations

Bibliography

 
 
 
 

Fighter squadrons of the United States Air Force